Lily Lake is a census-designated place in the town of Wheatland, Kenosha County, Wisconsin, United States. Its population was 508 as of the 2020 census.

Demographics

References

Census-designated places in Kenosha County, Wisconsin
Census-designated places in Wisconsin